Michaela Finn (born 2 May 1996) is a Swedish professional golfer who plays on the Symetra Tour.

Early life and amateur career
Finn was born in Ängelholm in 1996 and started playing golf at 12. At 15, she was admitted to the Swedish National High School of Golf.

Representing her National Team, Finn finished fourth at the 2012 European Young Masters, won bronze at the 2014 European Girls' Team Championship, and bronze again at the 2017 European Ladies' Team Championship. In 2014, she won a silver medal in the World Junior Girls Championship at Angus Glen Golf Club in Ontario, Canada, together with Emma Svensson and Filippa Möörk.

Finn attended Kent State University 2015–2019 and played golf with the Kent State Golden Flashes women's golf team in the Mid-American Conference. She won the Jim West Challenge in her freshman year. She won the Mid-American Conference Championship as a sophomore and finished runner-up her junior year. She was a three-time All-MAC First Team and collected a total of 17 top-10 performances.

She was runner-up at the 2018 Dixie Amateur behind Alexa Pano and competed at the inaugural Augusta National Women's Amateur in April 2019.

Professional career
Finn turned professional after she graduated in 2019 and before entering qualification for the LPGA Tour played in a few tournaments on the Swedish Golf Tour. She was runner-up behind Tonje Daffinrud at the Moss & Rygge Open in Norway, and won the Åhus Open at Kristianstad Golf Club.

In 2020, Finn joined the Symetra Tour. At the 2021 Symetra Tour Championship, she shot a course record 61 in the opening round after 10 birdies in the first 13 holes, before finishing the tournament tied for fifth.

In 2022, Finn shot 10-under-par to tie for 3rd at the Island Resort Championship.

Amateur wins
2011 Skandia Tour Regional #2 - Göteborg, Skandia Tour Regional #5 - Västergötland
2012 Skandia Tour Riks #2 - Västergötland, Skandia Tour Regional #6 - Skåne
2015 Jim West Challenge
2017 Mid-American Conference Championship 
2018 Illini Invitational at Medinah

Sources:

Professional wins (1)

Swedish Golf Tour wins (1)

Team appearances
Amateur
European Young Masters (representing Sweden): 2012
World Junior Girls Championship (representing Sweden): 2014
European Girls' Team Championship (representing Sweden): 2014
European Ladies' Team Championship (representing Sweden): 2017

References

External links

Swedish female golfers
Kent State Golden Flashes women's golfers
Sportspeople from Skåne County
People from Ängelholm Municipality
1996 births
Living people